The Persian nuthatch or the eastern rock-nuthatch (Sitta tephronota) is a species of bird in the family Sittidae. It is found in Afghanistan, Armenia, Azerbaijan, Georgia, India, Iran, Iraq, Kazakhstan, Pakistan, Russia, Tajikistan, Turkey, and Turkmenistan.

References

eastern rock-nuthatch
Birds of Central Asia
Birds of Western Asia
eastern rock-nuthatch
Taxonomy articles created by Polbot